Joe Filisko is an American blues harmonica player and maker of customized harmonicas based in Chicago, Illinois. In 2001 he was named "Harmonica Player of the Year" by the Society for the Preservation and Advancement of the Harmonica.  In addition to performing, and building customized harmonicas, he also teaches at the Old Town School of Folk Music.  The Hohner harmonica company describes him as the world's foremost authority on the diatonic harmonica.  He designed the distinctive conical cover plates of the Hohner Marine Band Thunderbird harmonicas.

References

American blues harmonica players
Old Town School of Folk musicians
Year of birth missing (living people)
Musicians from Chicago
Living people